When the Cat's Away is a Mickey Mouse short animated film first released on May 3, 1929, as part of the Mickey Mouse film series. It was directed by Walt Disney and animated by Ub Iwerks and Ben Sharpsteen. It was the sixth Mickey Mouse short to be produced, the third of that year. In this cartoon, Mickey and Minnie are the size of regular mice, and Tom Cat is the size of a person.

Plot
After Tom Cat leaves his house, drunk on hooch, Mickey organizes all his mice friends to break into the cat's house. Once inside, Mickey and Minnie play the piano by dancing on the keys and, later, others play some of the cat's musical instruments and records (using themselves as the speaker and stylus). In the end, Mickey and Minnie successfully kiss each other.

Production
The cartoon is a loose remake of Disney's 1925 film Alice Rattled by Rats, from the Alice Comedies series. This is the last time Mickey is portrayed as the size of a mouse, although he remains fairly small in his next cartoon, The Barnyard Battle.

The cat signs his name "Tom Cat", which was briefly used as a name for the character who was shortly afterwards identified as Peg-Leg Pete.

In an early script, the cartoon ended with the pet parrot calling the police, causing the mice to scurry away.

Voice cast
 Mickey Mouse: Walt Disney
 Minnie Mouse: Marcellite Garner
 Tom Cat: Nickson Bortamè
 Parrot: Peter Stinney

Reception
Motion Picture News (June 8, 1929): "This is one of the series of the Mickey Mouse cartoons. It is synchronized for sound, which brings the greater part of the laughs. The cat a-hunting goes and the mice play while the cat's away. They play everything from the piano, right down the line of musical instruments."

The Film Daily (July 28, 1929): "Amusing. Mickey and his relatives crash their way into the cat's home while the latter is hunting. The results is a music festival which proves genuinely amusing. As usual in this Disney series, the cartoon work is well thought out and intelligently and divertingly presented. Sure-fire for any audience.

Home media
The short was released on December 7, 2004, on Walt Disney Treasures: Mickey Mouse in Black and White, Volume Two: 1929-1935.

See also
Mickey Mouse (film series)

References

External links
 When the Cat's Away at Big Cartoon Database
 When the Cat's Away at Internet Movie Database
 When the Cat's Away at Mickey Mouse Follies: Black and White (Nov 14, 2007)
  When the Cat's Away at 2719 HYPERION (May 2, 2007)
 

1920s Disney animated short films
1929 films
1929 animated films
1929 comedy films
American black-and-white films
Mickey Mouse short films
Films directed by Walt Disney
Films produced by Walt Disney
Columbia Pictures short films
Columbia Pictures animated short films
Animated films about animals
American comedy short films
Animated films without speech
1920s American films